The 1998 Rhode Island gubernatorial election took place on November 3, 1998. Incumbent Republican Governor Lincoln Almond defeated Democratic nominee Myrth York in a rematch of the 1994 race.

Republican primary

Candidates
 Lincoln Almond, incumbent Governor of Rhode Island

Results

Democratic primary

Candidates
Myrth York, former Rhode Island State Senator, 1994 Democratic nominee for governor
Jack Dennison Potter, perennial candidate

Results

Cool Moose primary
Robert J. Healey, businessman and perennial candidate

Reform primary
Joseph Devine, 1992 Reform Party nominee for governor

Election results

References

1998
Gubernatorial
Rhode Island